The Torneo de Promoción y Reserva is a football tournament in Peru. There are currently 16 clubs in the league. Each team will have in staff to twelve 21-year-old players, three of 19 and three experienced; whenever they be recorded in the club. The team champion in this tournament will offer two points and the runner-up a point of bonus to the respective regular team in the 2013 Torneo Descentralizado.

Teams

League table

Results

References

Res
2013